Initium is the 1984 debut album by American deathrock band Samhain, released on lead singer Glenn Danzig's independent record label Plan 9. In various interviews, Danzig stated that the album's title, which translates from Latin to English as "beginning", represents his new start after disbanding his prior band, Misfits, in 1983. Most of the final track, "Archangel", was actually recorded in March 1981, and was originally meant to either be a Misfits song featuring Dave Vanian (who never did vocals for the song) or a track for the band the Damned. The track "Horror Biz" likewise dates to Danzig's Misfits era, as it is a new version of "Horror Business" with different musical arrangements. The album was recorded at Reel Platinum studio in Lodi, New Jersey, excluding the introduction which was recorded at Eerie Von's home on a four track cassette.

Also appearing on this recording are Lyle Preslar, guitarist for the influential D.C. band Minor Threat (CD tracks 2, 4, 6, and 7),  and Al Pike, bassist for Reagan Youth (CD track 9).

Different versions
The 1986 cassette release features Initium plus the entire original version of the band's follow-up record, the Unholy Passion EP, and is highly prized by collectors. Also much sought is the initial 1987 CD release of Initium, which featured the album plus the re-recorded/remixed version of the EP. (In 1989, these extra tracks were removed from all future CD pressings, and were instead included on the original 1990 Final Descent album). A very rare pressing exists, which contains the full Initium album and only the remixed title track from the EP. Likewise, some copies of the 2001 Initium reissue also feature the song "Unholy Passion" as an unlisted bonus track.

Track listing 
All songs written and composed by Glenn Danzig.

Orig. 1984 LP and most CD/cassette releases

* Unlisted bonus track only on 1989 2nd press CD and on some copies of 2001 reissue

1986 cassette, 1987 CD

* The first two songs are a single track on all CD releases of the album.
*** This song appears on the Initium CD of the 1987 remix.

Personnel

Tracks 1–9 
 Glenn Danzig - vocals, guitar
 Eerie Von - bass
 Steve Zing - drums, ambience on "Initium"

Tracks 10–15 
 See Unholy Passion

References

1984 debut albums
Albums produced by Glenn Danzig
Gothic rock albums by American artists
Hardcore punk albums by American artists
Plan 9 Records albums
Samhain (band) albums